Finland–Iceland relations are foreign relations between Finland and Iceland. Both nations are mutual members of the Arctic Council, Council of the Baltic Sea States, Council of Europe, NB8, Nordic Council, Organisation for Economic Co-operation and Development and the United Nations.

History
Both Finland and Iceland were united as one nation under the Kalmar Union from 1397 - 1523. In December 1917, Finland obtained its independence from Russia and Iceland obtained its independence from Denmark in June 1944. Both nations officially established diplomatic relations on 15 August 1947. Initially, Finland maintained its relations with Iceland from its embassy in Oslo, Norway, while Iceland maintained relations with Finland from its embassy in Stockholm, Sweden. Finland opened its resident embassy in Reykjavík in 1982. Iceland opened its embassy in Helsinki in 1997.

Trade 

Iceland, as a member of the European Free Trade Association has unrestricted access to the European Union market (which includes Finland). In 2015, total trade between Iceland and the EU totaled 5.7 billion euros.

Resident diplomatic missions 
 Finland has an embassy in Reykjavík.
 Iceland has an embassy in Helsinki.

European Union
Finland joined the EU in 1995. Iceland has never been a member of EU.

NATO 
While Iceland was a founding full member of NATO. Finland has never been a member of NATO.

See also  
 Foreign relations of Finland 
 Foreign relations of Iceland
 Nordic Passport Union
 Scandinavia
 Iceland–EU relations

References

 

 
Iceland
Bilateral relations of Iceland